James Jones House is a historic home located at Greensboro in Greene County, Pennsylvania. It was built around 1879, and is a -story, three bay, "I"-plan brick dwelling in the Italianate style. A front porch in the Colonial Revival style was added about 1900 and a -story frame addition was built about 1950.  The house features a shallow pitched roof with wide eaves and tall, arched windows with raised brick crowns.

It was listed on the National Register of Historic Places in 1995.

References 

Houses on the National Register of Historic Places in Pennsylvania
Colonial Revival architecture in Pennsylvania
Italianate architecture in Pennsylvania
Houses completed in 1879
Houses in Greene County, Pennsylvania
National Register of Historic Places in Greene County, Pennsylvania